Mantidactylus bourgati is a species of frog in the family Mantellidae. The species is endemic to Madagascar.

Range and habitat
Mantidactylus bourgati is found only on the Andringitra Massif in Madagascar's Central Highlands. It inhabits, and breeds in, clear streams running through montane forests and in montane grasslands above the treeline.

The species requires clear streams, and is affected by habitat degradation. Its extent of occurrence (EOO) is 1,313 km2.

Taxonomy
Mantidactylus bourgati previously considered as M. curtus, populations from the Andringitra Massif have recently been resurrected under the name M. bourgati. Specimens of quite variable morphology and colouration can be found along streams both inside montane forest and above the treeline (Glaw and Vences 2007).

References

External Links 

 AmphibiaWeb

bourgati
Amphibians described in 1974
Endemic fauna of Madagascar
Fauna of the Madagascar subhumid forests